In organic chemistry, an aminomethyl group is a monovalent functional group with formula  or .  It can be described as a methylene bridge  with one bond filled by an amino group .

It is one of a series of 1-aminoalkyl groups of the form .

Aminomethyl is used in the standard (IUPAC) names of some compounds, such as 4-(aminomethyl) benzoic acid.

References

Amines
Functional groups